Family is the debut studio album by folk rock family ensemble Thompson. It was released by Fantasy Records, part of Concord Music, on 17 November 2014.

Background

Family was conceived by Teddy Thompson when, after he lost his recording contract with Verve Records and came to the end of a serious relationship, he approached his musical family members to contribute to an all-Thompson album. Teddy Thompson states: "I had some kind of mid-life crisis early and was having a real hard time with personal stuff...so I decided to make this record", stating further that "family is really important, and I've missed them". He told Uncut: "I came up with this project to get everyone back together. I was really trying to heal some wounds for myself, but I dragged everyone along with me", stating elsewhere that one of the rules for the album were that "every instrument must be played by a family member".

According to New Yorker magazine, the Thompson family "rival the Wainwright-McGarrigle-Roche clan when it comes to multigenerational musical talent". The musicians involved on this album span three generations and include Teddy Thompson's long separated parents Richard and Linda Thompson, his sister Kami Thompson and her husband James Walbourne (also her bandmate in The Rails) as well as nephew Zak Hobbs and half-brother Jack Thompson (son of Richard Thompson from his second marriage). The band is completed with assistance from Walbourne's brother Rob on drums and Teddy Thompson's eldest sister (and Zach Hobbs mother) Muna Mascolo, who is not a musician, on backing vocals.

Writing and recording

The various musicians contributed a song or two each as well as playing on each other's material. According to Richard Thompson, the contributions took "two to three years" to compile, with everyone writing their own material and sending files to each other. The album was then worked on throughout 2013 by Teddy Thompson and completed with studio sessions in London and New York afterwards with all the participating family members in attendance.

Various members of the family have commented on the rivalry the album has raised amongst themselves. Kami Thompson commented on the project: "The whole album is like a family songwriting competition – it's a bloody nightmare. I mean, what could possibly go wrong"? Similarly, Teddy Thompson stated that "the album became something of a family songwriting contest", but conceded elsewhere that "it's not as if we're having family therapy and making everyone pay 12 bucks to hear it". NPR Music comment in an article that "what you get here is a family album in the truest sense of the world, with everyone involved clamoring to be heard while competing for attention with people they love". Richard Thompson gives a metaphorical explanation for Family, stating that the album is "like an enormous cardigan with eight holes for heads (that) you knit everyone into", telling Mojo that "it's fun to do".

Family was released on CD, vinyl, and as a digital download. A deluxe CD was also released which included a DVD containing the short documentary Thompson: The Making of Family.

Critical reception

On the Metacritic website, which aggregates reviews from critics and assigns a normalised rating out of 100, Family received a score of 75, based on 3 mixed and 9 positive reviews. Record Collector called the Thompsons "an astonishingly talented family" in their review, commenting that "most of them have made records of note on their own over the last year or so, but this union is something very special indeed". Q state that "what could have diluted their individual talents instead enhances everyone's reputation" and call Family "the greatest family jam you'll ever hear and an absolutely essential album". The Daily Telegraph write that "there was bound to be a competitive edge but all the various age groups rise to the occasion" and call it "a fine album". The Guardian state that "you wouldn’t want to share a group therapy session with them, but it makes for a musically fabulous and lyrically compelling album" in their review. Uncut write that Family is "a more nuanced guide to the Thompsons’ flawed but just-about functioning dynamic, divorces, remarriages and all", calling the album "dysfunctional but somehow comforting". On a similar theme, Consequence of Sound write in their review of the album that "there is a creative disquiet about it, as much dysfunction as affection" and claim there is an "inevitable lack of cohesion". AllMusic write that "if it doesn't always feel like the dream collaboration between these gifted relations, Family clearly demonstrates what makes them special, individually and collectively". Opinion is divided however, with "the family firm ... clearly in excellent health" according to Mojo who call the album "an unusually harmonious kind of family get-together". The Observer review claims that "inevitably it’s the contributions of the parents who attract most interest" but call it Family "an enjoyable, ramshackle collection". The review at Folk Radio UK states "there can be few if any more talented musical families and the proof is right here".

Track listing

Personnel

Jack Thompson – bass (6)
Linda Thompson – vocals (1, 4, 8 & 9)
Richard Thompson – acoustic guitar (2, 6 & 9), vocals (2 & 9), doumbek (2 & 9), electric guitar (3 & 6), hurdy-gurdy (5)
Kami Thompson – vocals (3, 9 & 10), acoustic guitar (10)
Teddy Thompson – acoustic guitar (1 & 7), vocals (1, 2, 3, 4, 7 & 9), bass (2 & 7), pump organ (5, 8 & 9), piano (8), electric guitar (8)
Zak Hobbs – acoustic guitar (1, 4 & 5), electric guitar (2 & 3), mandolin (2 & 9), slide guitar (7), vocals (5 & 9)
James Walbourne – bass (3), acoustic guitar (3 & 10), electric guitar (7 & 9), vocals (9 & 10)
Rob Walbourne – drums & percussion (2, 3, 7 & 9), organ (3), vocals (9)
Paulina Lis – vocals (3 & 7)
Muna Mascalo – vocals (9)
Brooke Gengras – vocals (9)

References

2014 debut albums
Concord Music Group albums
Fantasy Records albums
Thompson (folk rock band) albums